Rachel Rhodes (born April 15, 1993), known professionally as , is a Japanese singer and model. She portrayed and co-voiced the character Lumi, the fictional lead vocalist of Genki Rockets in 2006. She debuted as a solo singer in 2013.

Early life and education

Rachel Rhodes was born in North Carolina, United States on April 15, 1993, but moved to Japan at the age of 3. She attended an American school at Yokota Air Base. Rhodes is a hāfu from an American father who was from Michigan and a Japanese mother and is fluent in both English and Japanese. When Rhodes was in first grade, she was inspired to become a singer after hearing her mother listening to "First Love" by Hikaru Utada. She was later influenced by Mariya Takeuchi and Love Psychedelico. When she was in third grade she listened to American R&B artists Alicia Keys and Usher. Her younger brother is model Musashi Rhodes.

Career

2006-2013: Genki Rockets

Yasuda first began modeling in 2006, and appeared in a promotional campaign for Sony's CMOS Sensors. At age 13, Yasuda auditioned to appear in Genki Rockets' music video by dancing to BoA's "Valenti" and singing "Happy Birthday to You." She passed the audition two days later and was not only asked to appear in the music video, but as a singer as well. Yasuda became the image model for Lumi, the band's virtual vocalist, and providing vocals along with Nami Miyahara. The band's first single "Heavenly Star" and its music video were featured in video game Lumines II and No More Heroes. The song was nominated for Best Song by Spike Video Game Awards in 2006 while the band won Best New Artist in Electronic category from iTunes in 2007. As her junior high school didn't allow students to perform, Yasuda kept her work with Genki Rockets a secret and later transferred schools to continue pursuing a singing career.

Yasuda acted as Lumi in Child of Eden, where she was resurrected as a persona in the 23rd century. The player is tasked with saving her from a malicious virus. While in Genki Rockets, Yasuda gained no stage experience because all of the band's events use high tech pre-recorded video of her for Live PA, with the notable example of Lumi introducing the former U.S. Vice President Al Gore using Musion Eyeliner in Live Earth concert, Tokyo 2007. Yasuda noted that at first her voice and appearance are heavily processed but later the process effect became weaker and her identity became more clear.

2013-present: Solo career

After graduating high school, Yasuda decided to pursue a full-time music career in spite of advice given to her to attend university instead. In 2013, Yasuda changed agencies and debuted as a solo singer under Sony Records with her Japanese name, Rei Yasuda, debuting with "Best of My Love", which served as the ending theme to Space Battleship Yamato 2199. Unlike Genki Rockets, the song's music video was shot on location instead of a green screen. In its music video, the UFO came to the world where the civilization hasn't been developed, which Yasuda found that that contrast is interesting. Kenji Tamai, who Yasuda worked with in Genki Rockets, helped produce and prepare for her solo debut after her high school graduation. In addition to singing, Yasuda also continued modeling, starting the fashion blog Nylonista for Nylon Japan and performing for Nylon's special stage in Girls Award 2013 Autumn/Winter. In April 2014, she started shoe blog for ABC-Mart, accompanied with the release of her single "Passcode 4854." She participated in Escada fashion event in April 2014 and Tokyo Girls Collection festival once a year from 2013 to 2016, with the 2013 Autumn/Winter being her first live performance. She was featured in Sendai Collection 2014 and her song "Inside Out" became the brand's promotional single for the brand's event in August 2014.

Her first two albums, Will and Prism, both ranked first on the Japanese iTunes Store's J-Pop Top Album chart and second on the Overall Album chart. She was selected as Japanese iTunes New Artist 2014 and nominated in 57th Japan Record Awards for Best New Artist in 2015.

In August 2015, she performed to 34,000 youths from 150 countries gathered in Yamaguchi Prefecture for 23rd World Scout Jamboree.

She had been appeared as a model for three consecutive years on Flags fashion building in Shinjuku for its 16th-18th anniversary and was selected along with Rihwa as campaign ambassadors for its 20th anniversary. She was both the performer and model for Kansai Collection Autumn/Winter 2016. She was the 60th Tokyo IT Girls model for Vogue Girl Japan.

Her first live performance outside Japan was in November 2016 for the event "Japan Media Mix Festival in Taipei 2016". She was nominated for Best Teen Choice Award in 2016 MTV Video Music Awards Japan.

In 2017, she became Lumine Est brand ambassador and her song "Up to Me" became its promotional theme for their summer collection and "Not Enough" for winter collection.

Radio host
Rei hosted her own program "City Girls Music" for Japan FM Network since 2016. She also co-host "JA Zen-noh Countdown Japan" with another British-Japanese radio personality George Williams for Tokyo FM in every Saturday noon began in April 2017.

Other works
Rei was the NylonTV Japan's backstage reporter for Vantan Cutting Edge 2013 fashion show. She was selected as Yahoo! Japan smartphone guide for iTunes Festival 2014 in London, interviewing Foxes, Jenny Lewis, and Clean Bandit. She wrote the lyrics for the Japanese version of Charli XCX's song Boom Clap and later wrote the lyrics for some of her own songs. She made a cameo appearance in TBS drama "100 days: Love, Marriage, Sickness and Mom" that used her song "Ashitairo" as theme song.

Discography

Albums

EP

Singles

Digital singles

As featured artist

References

External links 
 

1993 births
Living people
Singers from Tokyo
Japanese pop singers
Japanese women pop singers
Japanese pop musicians
Sony Music Entertainment Japan artists
21st-century Japanese singers
21st-century Japanese women singers
Anime singers
Anime musicians
Japanese people of American descent
Japanese female models
Japanese radio personalities